is a Japanese swimmer. She competed in the women's 4 × 200 metre freestyle relay event at the 2016 Summer Olympics.

References

External links
 

1994 births
Living people
Olympic swimmers of Japan
Swimmers at the 2016 Summer Olympics
Place of birth missing (living people)
Asian Games medalists in swimming
Asian Games gold medalists for Japan
Asian Games silver medalists for Japan
Swimmers at the 2018 Asian Games
Medalists at the 2018 Asian Games
Japanese female freestyle swimmers
21st-century Japanese women